Hassan Ali Ibrahim Ali Ahmad Al-Balooshi (born December 16, 1981) is a football player from the United Arab Emirates (UAE). He currently plays for Emirates Club.

References

External links
 

1981 births
Living people
Emirati footballers
Al Ahli Club (Dubai) players
Al-Wasl F.C. players
Emirates Club players
Al-Ittihad Kalba SC players
Footballers at the 2002 Asian Games
Emirati people of Baloch descent
UAE First Division League players
UAE Pro League players
Association football midfielders
Asian Games competitors for the United Arab Emirates
United Arab Emirates international footballers